Gianrico Tedeschi (20 April 1920 – 27 July 2020) was an Italian actor and voice actor.

Life and career
Born in Milan in April 1920, Tedeschi got a degree in pedagogy before enrolling at the Silvio D'Amico National Academy of Dramatic Art, which he abandoned after two years to make his professional debut with the Evi Maltagliati-Salvo Randone-Tino Carraro stage company. In the late 1940s he entered the Andreina Pagnani-Gino Cervi theatrical company, with whom he got his first personal success for his performance in the comedy play Quel signore che venne a pranzo. He later worked intensively with Luchino Visconti and with the Piccolo Teatro directed by Giorgio Strehler. He also toured in the United States, the Soviet Union, Paris and London.

In his variegated career, Tedeschi was very active as a voice actor, a dubber and a radio personality, and starting from the early 1950s he appeared in numerous films and TV series, even if often playing supporting roles. He appeared in 50 films between 1943 and 2013.

On 20 April 2020, Tedeschi celebrated his 100th birthday and received a special message from the Italian President Sergio Mattarella that same day. Tedeschi died on July 27 of that year in Pettenasco.

Selected filmography

 The Peddler and the Lady (1943) - Un giocatore al tavolo di baccarat (uncredited)
 The Steamship Owner (1951) - Il pianista
 We Two Alone (1952) - The Staff Administrator
 Public Opinion (1954) - Egisto Bianchi
 The Last Five Minutes (1955) - Il pianista
 Bravissimo (1955) - Theatre impresario
 I pappagalli (1955) - The painter
 Susanna Whipped Cream (1957) - Gianluca
 Femmine tre volte (1957) - Vassili
 Carmela è una bambola (1958) - The Psychoanalyst
 Caporale di giornata (1958) - Colonel Felice
 The Law (1959) - Primo disoccupato
 Non perdiamo la testa (1959) - Prof. Daniele
 La cento chilometri (1959) - The Race Walker Friend of Buscaglione
 The Employee (1960) - Director
 Carthage in Flames (1960) - Eleo
 Adua and Friends (1960) - Stefano
 The Fascist (1961) - Arcangelo Bardacci
 Madame (1961) - Roquet
 Three Fables of Love (1962) - Valerio (segment "Le lièvre et le tortue")
 Gli eroi del doppio gioco (1962) - Pietro Malaguti
 Destination Rome (1963) - A crook
 Ro.Go.Pa.G. (1963) - The psychiatrist (segment "Illibatezza") (uncredited)
 I 4 tassisti (1963) - L'uomo in blue (segment "L'uomo in blue")
 Un marito in condominio (1963) - Ulisse
 The Mona Lisa Has Been Stolen (1966) - Gaspard, l'inspecteur de Police parisien
 How I Learned to Love Women (1966) - Il direttore - marito di Ilde
 Il marito è mio e l'ammazzo quando mi pare (1968) - Embalmer
 Gli infermieri della mutua (1969) - Prof. Giacomo Garinoni
 Brancaleone at the Crusades (1970) - Pantaleo
 Il merlo maschio (1971) - Orchestra Conductor
 Io non vedo, tu non parli, lui non sente (1971) - Police Commissioner Salvatore Mazzia
 Hector the Mighty (1972) - Priamo
 L'uccello migratore (1972) - Onorevole Michele Pomeraro
 Frankenstein - Italian Style (1975) - Dr. Frankenstein
 Mimì Bluette... fiore del mio giardino (1976) - Maurice
 Sex with a Smile II (1976) - Silvestri (segment "La visita")
 Il mostro (1977)
 La presidentessa (1977) - Judge Agostino Tricanti
 Dr. Jekyll Likes Them Hot (1979) - James / Jeeves
 Hurricane Rosy (1979) - Le Comte / The Earl
 Prestazione straordinaria (1994) - Grisaglia
 Long Live Freedom (2013) - Furlan

See also
 List of centenarians (actors, filmmakers and entertainers)

References

External links

1920 births
2020 deaths
20th-century Italian male actors
21st-century Italian male actors
Male actors from Milan
Italian male film actors
Italian male stage actors
Italian male television actors
Italian male voice actors
Italian male radio actors
Italian centenarians
Men centenarians
Accademia Nazionale di Arte Drammatica Silvio D'Amico alumni
Università Cattolica del Sacro Cuore alumni
Italian military personnel of World War II